Gloeandromyces is a genus of fungi in the family Laboulbeniaceae. The genus contains five species. All species are associated with Neotropical bat flies (Diptera, Hippoboscoidea, Streblidae).

References

External links
Gloeandromyces at Index Fungorum

Laboulbeniaceae
Laboulbeniales genera